Nemapogon inconditella is a moth of the family Tineidae. It is found in most of Europe and North Africa, including Morocco.

The wingspan is 12–16 mm. Adults are similar to Nemapogon clematella. Both species have cream-white forewings, covered with light brown scales. However, inconditella has two spots at the base of the frontal margin. Furthermore, there is a dark spot in the middle.

The larvae feed on fungi, including Trametes versicolor.

References

Moths described in 1956
Nemapogoninae